The women's synchronized 10 metre platform was one of eight diving events included in the Diving at the 2000 Summer Olympics programme and one of the four new events added for the 2000 games since a change was made in 1924.

The competition was held as an outright final:

Final 28 September — Each pair of divers performed five dives freely chosen from the five diving groups, with two dives limited to a 2.0 degree of difficulty and the others without limitation. Divers could perform different dives during the same dive if both presented the same difficulty degree. The final ranking was determined by the score attained by the pair after all five dives had been performed.

Results
 Values in brackets represent the aggregate score and ranking at the end of the dive.

References

Sources
 

Women
2000
2000 in women's diving
Women's events at the 2000 Summer Olympics